Pem Sluijter (15 May 1939 – 18 December 2007) was a Dutch poet.

Biography 
Pem Sluijter was born in 1939 in Middelburg, Netherlands.

Sluijter worked between 1959 and 1963 as journalist at Het Parool.

Sluijter made her debut at 58 years of age with poetry collection Roos is een bloem (1997). She won the C. Buddingh'-prijs for this debut. Her second poetry collection Het licht van Attica was published in 2004. Both of her publications were published by De Arbeiderspers.

Sluijter died in The Hague in December 2007.

In 2018, her poem Nachtbraak was added to a wall in the Batjanstraat in The Hague, both in Dutch and translated into English.

Awards 
 1997: C. Buddingh'-prijs, Roos is een bloem

Publications 
 Roos is een bloem (1997)
 Het licht van Attica (2004)

Notes

References

External links 

  (in Dutch)
 Pem Sluijter, Digital Library for Dutch Literature

1939 births
2007 deaths
Dutch women poets
C. Buddingh' Prize winners